Neuro-cardio-facial-cutaneous-syndromes (NCFC), (also referred to as neuro-craniofacial-cardiac syndromes) is a group of developmental disorders with a genetic ground, affecting the nervous system, circulatory system, (cranio)facial and cutaneous development. These four parts are the common denominator for the syndromes, but are mostly accompanied by disturbances in other parts of the body.

The two most common syndromes under this "umbrella" are: Leopard syndrome (LS) and Noonan syndrome (NS).

Other members are Costello syndrome (CS), cardio-facio-cutaneous syndrome (CFC) and Neurofibromatosis type I (NF1). Recently, it has been observed that NCFC syndromes result from de novo germline mutations that alter the Ras/Raf/Mek signal transduction pathway.  These are called RASopathies.

One percent of autistic children have either a loss or duplication in a region of Chromosome 16 that encompasses the gene for ERK 1. Mutations within the ERK signal transduction pathway appears to be a common cause for NCFC syndromes. Some autistic children also have craniofacial and cardiac defects.

See also

 SPRED1 gene
 Legius syndrome

References 

 
Developmental neuroscience
RASopathies